Apatema impunctella is a moth of the family Autostichidae. It is found on Corsica and Sardinia and in France and Italy.

References

Moths described in 1940
Apatema
Moths of Europe